Zametopina is a genus of spiders in the family Thomisidae. It was first described in 1909 by Simon. , it contains only one species, Zametopina calceata, found in China and Vietnam.

References

Thomisidae
Monotypic Araneomorphae genera
Spiders of Asia